Tawa College is a state coeducational secondary school located in Tawa, Wellington, New Zealand. The school opened in 1961, and primarily serves students in Tawa and the surrounding suburbs. A total of  students from Years 9 to 13 attend the school as of

History 

Tawa College opened in February 1961.

Demographics
At the September 2012 Education Review Office (ERO) review, Tawa College had 1417 students enrolled, including nine international students. Forty-six percent of students were male and 54 percent were female. Fifty-seven percent of students identified as New Zealand European (Pākehā), 16 percent identified as Māori, 14 percent as Asian, 12 percent as Pacific Islanders, and one percent as another ethnicity.

Blocks 
Tawa College currently has 12 classroom blocks: A Block, B Block, C Block, D Block, E Block, F Block, G Block, H Block, J Block, K Block S Block and T Block. 

Like many New Zealand secondary schools of the era, the school was constructed to the Nelson Two-Storey standard plan, distinguished by its two-storey H-shaped classroom blocks. Tawa College has three of these blocks: B block, C block, and D block.

A Block is the foods, dance, woodwork and art block. B Block is home to social studies classes as well as: psychology, history, geography, science and more. C Block is home to english, science, computer labs and more. D Block's classrooms includes: English, maths, maths offices, science and more. E Block is the language block with Japanese, Maori and french. F Block is the drama block with a miniature theatre which was recently revamped with the help from Nick Brown, HOD of Drama and Dance. G Block is a one story block which spans around the netball and basketball courts with all sorts of classrooms. H Block is the music block with: three studios, two music classrooms, a music office, a big music space, the school hall. J Block is the science block with two science classrooms. K Block is the retired kindergarten recently purchased by Tawa College and is currently used if there are no available classrooms. S Block is the special learning block for people with special learning needs.

Uniform
The traditional colours of Tawa College are blue, red and yellow, as seen in the school uniform, sports strips and crest. The uniform skirt for the girls is a kilt made of Duncan tartan. The college has special permission from the Scottish clan, to whom the tartan belongs (as intellectual property), to use the tartan in its uniform.

Tawa Recreation Centre
The Tawa Recreation Centre (informally known as "the rec centre") is a joint venture between Tawa College and the Wellington City Council. The facility contains two gymnasiums, two sets of male and female changing rooms, a large foyer area, P.E equipment sheds, a Wellington City Council Office and reception area, P.E department offices, and a classroom on the mezzanine.

Successes
The school is well known for its achievements in the arts, notably singing, including several national and international barbershop quartet and chorus champions, such as the Musical Island Boys (national barbershop champions, 2004; international collegiate quartet champions, 2006; Barbershop Harmony Society International Quartet Champions, 2014). Their auditioned chamber choir Blue Notes have also received national success, including their achievements at The Big Sing festival, where they received the gold award.

They also have a big reputation due to their wrestling team, TCW, who have been twice national champions.

In 2009, the principal at the time, Mr Lucas, and approximately 38 year 13 chemistry students beat the Guinness world record for the most hours of consecutive teaching with their 28-hour chemistry teach-a-thon. This was put together as a fundraiser for World Vision, and through it they raised over $3,000.

Notable alumni
Notable alumni include:
 Jerry Collins – All Blacks captain
 Sophie Devine – Women's Black Cap
 Taito Phillip Field – former Member of Parliament
 Mark Gillespie – Black Cap
 Blair Hilton – national field hockey representative and 2010 Commonwealth Games bronze medallist
 Elizabeth Knox - New Zealand writer
 Nick Leggett – fourth Mayor of Porirua
 Murray Mexted – rugby union commentator, former All Black 
 Kerry Prendergast – former Mayor of Wellington
 Lee Tamahori – film director
 Louis Fenton – former member of Wellington Phoenix Football Club, All Whites
 Amelia Kerr – international cricketer, granddaughter of Bruce Murray
 Tony Backhouse - musician and composer
 Musical Island Boys, 2014 Barbershop Harmony Society International Quartet Champions

Principals

 1961–66 – Alan Mackie
 1966–81 – Eric Flaws
 1981–89 – Brian Walker
 1989–2002 – Bruce Murray
 2002–2021 – Murray Lucas
2022–present – Andrew Savage

References

External links
 Tawa College Website
 

Educational institutions established in 1961
Secondary schools in the Wellington Region
Schools in Wellington City
New Zealand secondary schools of Nelson plan construction
1961 establishments in New Zealand